Duke Kunshan University (DKU) is a Wuhan University–Duke University joint venture, independently accredited university in Kunshan, Jiangsu, China. 

In 2018, Duke Kunshan University welcomed their first inaugural undergraduate class.

History and timeline 
 Jan. 2010 – A Cooperation Agreement signed between Duke University and the People's Government of Kunshan

 Sep. 2010 – Construction of Phase 1 campus started
 Jan. 2011 – Cooperation Principles Statement signed between Duke University and Wuhan University
 Jun. 2011 – Application for Preparation Approval of Duke Kunshan University submitted to Jiangsu Provincial Bureau of Education
 Aug. 2012 – Preparation Approval from the Chinese Ministry of Education
 Sep. 2012 – Appointments of Duke Kunshan Chancellor and Executive Vice Chancellor
Dec. 2012 – Celebration Ceremony of Preparation Approval in Kunshan
 Apr. 2013 – Application for formal establishment of Duke Kunshan University submitted to Jiangsu Provincial Bureau of Education
 Sep. 2013  – Duke Kunshan Establishment Approval granted by the Chinese Ministry of Education
 Nov. 2013 – First meeting of Duke Kunshan Board of Trustees held at Wuhan University
 Dec. 2013 – Duke Kunshan legal entity registration completed
 Jan. 2014 – Duke Kunshan Advisory Board established
 Apr. 2014 – Second Meeting of Duke Kunshan Board of Trustees held in Kunshan
 May 2014 – First meeting of Duke Kunshan Advisory Board held in Beijing
 Jul. 2014 – Duke Kunshan MMS program began in Durham
 Aug. 2014  – Inaugural Convocation and Orientation Week held at Duke Kunshan University
 Aug. 2018 – Inaugural undergraduate program begins
Aug. 2019 – Innovation Building opened, construction of Phase 2 campus begins
Jan. 2020 – COVID-19 forces international students off campus, DKU switches to hybrid classes 
Aug. 2020 – First group of DKU undergraduates begin study abroad at Duke's main campus.
May 2022 – Inaugural undergraduate of 2022 graduates in hybrid ceremony at Duke and DKU's campuses

Administration and organization 
Duke Kunshan University is governed by an independent Board of Trustees, with members from Duke University and Wuhan University.

Academics

Undergraduate admissions 
Duke Kunshan University admitted its first undergraduate students as part of the Class of 2022. Significantly exceeding its original target of 1,500 applicants, the university received a total of 3,143 applications for an estimated 225 first-year spots, including 2,551 applications from China and 332 from the United States. There were 80 countries represented in the applicant pool, including Kazakhstan, South Korea, Pakistan, and Ethiopia.

In March 2018, DKU admitted 251 students, or 7.98% of its inaugural applicant pool, a selectivity similar to the 8.3% acceptance rate at Duke University.

All undergraduate applications for Duke Kunshan are submitted using the Common Application. Students applying to Duke University can also check a box on the Duke application to apply for admission to Duke Kunshan University. International students, including those from the United States, typically submit transcripts, SAT or ACT standardized test scores, and application essays.  However, a test-optional policy is in effect for applications submitted in 2020 and 2021.

Graduate admissions 
Students can apply separately to each of DKU's five graduate programs.

Academic programs 

The undergraduate curriculum is structured into divisional areas of knowledge (Natural and Applied Sciences, Social Sciences, and Arts and Humanities) in contrast with traditional university academic departments. Undergraduate students declare their major in sophomore year. There are 15 majors approved by the Chinese Ministry of Education so far, which span the natural sciences, social sciences, and arts and humanities. Many of the majors have multiple tracks or concentrations that students choose between. 

Core components of the undergraduate curriculum include core courses (taken once per year for the first three years), with each major consisting of an "interdisciplinary set of courses that integrates different forms of knowledge and a distinct set of disciplinary courses that provides expertise in specific areas". Semesters are broken up into two seven week sessions, and classes are not scheduled on Fridays to support field trips, internships, and other co-curricular activities. Additionally, international students, including those from the United States, are required to take Chinese language for the first two years and can continue with more advanced courses afterwards.

In November 2022, DKU launched the Duke Kunshan–Duke-NUS Medicine Pathway for undergraduates studying data science and global health/biology to complete their Doctor of Medicine at Duke NUS Medical School in Singapore.

Academic freedom concerns 
An article in the Financial Times stated that although Duke Kunshan University had signed legally binding agreements with Education Ministry of China that guaranteed academic freedom on campus, many academics had doubts that the agreements would be upheld.

Rankings
Both Duke University and Wuhan University have been recognized in the top ten in respective national rankings.

Campus 
Duke Kunshan is located in a 200-acre campus in Kunshan, a city in southeastern Jiangsu province. The campus will become the center of the Duke Creative Park, part of the city's “Five Zones, One Line” plan for urban renewal. The area will host the Sino-US (Kunshan) Technology Innovation Center and serve as a mixed-used project integrating R&D centers, business services, and ecological parks.

Kunshan's location between Shanghai and Suzhou allows easy access to these major metropolitan centers by highways and high-speed railway.

The campus is being constructed in phases, with Phase I designed by American design and architecture firm Gensler. Phase 1 facilities include an academic building with a variety of classroom configurations, a 200-bed dormitory building, a conference center and hotel, a faculty residence, and an administration building. An innovation center equipped with a library, classrooms and team rooms was opened in 2019.

Phase 2 is scheduled for completion in 2023, designed by Perkins and Will, and will feature an expansion of undergraduate, graduate, and faculty housing, a community center, recreation center, the WD Research Institute, and a library. The 71.3 acre Duke Kunshan Gardens are also currently under construction, and are scheduled for completion in 2023.

Later plans call for Phase III and IV construction to take place in the coming decade. 

As part of the partnership between Duke University, Wuhan University, and the city of Kunshan, the municipal government has leased the Duke Kunshan University campus to the university at no cost for the first ten years as well as paying for construction of the buildings.

Alumni 
Duke Kunshan University alumni are coterminous with Duke Alumni, being conferred Duke University undergraduate or graduate degrees (accredited by SACSCOC) upon graduation. Undergraduates also receive a graduation certificate and diploma officially approved by the Chinese MOE.

Undergraduate alumni from the inaugural class of 2022 include 1 Rhodes Scholar, 2 Yenching Scholars, and 2 Schwarzman Scholar.

Research centers 

 Global Health Research Center (1st research center at Duke Kunshan)
 Environmental Research Center

Conferences 
International Meteorite Conference, Meteorite China – Duke Kunshan University hosted China's first-ever international meteorite conference on 15 September 2017. Over 80 scientists from China, the U.S., the U.K., Australia, and Russia met at the three-day event. Enthusiasts and meteorite collectors also participated in the conference.

References

External links
Official website 
Official website 

Wuhan University
Duke University
Universities and colleges in Suzhou
Kunshan
Educational institutions established in 2013
2013 establishments in China
Duke family